Gyalecta kibiensis is a species of saxicolous (rock-dwelling), crustose lichen in the family Gyalectaceae. Found in Japan, it was formally described as a new species in 2005 by Hiroshi Harada and Isao Yoshimura. The type specimen was collected from limestone in Iwatutsudani (Takahashi, Okayama). The thallus of the lichen is smooth and has a light greyish-green colour. A year later it was later recorded growing on a limestone outcrop on the banks of the Takano River, in Ehime Prefecture.

References

Gyalectales
Lichen species
Lichens described in 2005
Lichens of Japan